The Bronze Medallion is the highest award conferred upon civilians by New York City.

The medal is presented by the Mayor to those individuals who have demonstrated, "exceptional citizenship and outstanding achievement". The recipients come from a wide range of backgrounds, including ordinary citizens, foreign dignitaries, athletes, and film stars.

Description

The medallion is two and three quarter inches in diameter and was designed by Michael Lantz, best known for his 1938 sculpture in front of the Federal Trade Commission building in Washington, DC.

Recipients

 Muhammad Ali, heavyweight boxing champion
 David Asch (1968)
 Wesley Autrey, on January 5, 2007, for heroism for saving the life of a fellow commuter by throwing himself over his body in the face of an oncoming train
 Tony Bennett, singer (1969)
 Sam Briskman, inventor of pinking shears. On reverse: Presented to Sam Briskman, humanitarian and benefactor, by Robert F. Wagner, Mayor of the City of New York, February 19, 1958.
 Samuel Brooks, NYC Zoning board, Distinguished Service Given to him from Mayor Lindsey
 Roy Campanella, baseball player (1969)
 The Dessoff Choirs, in 1975, for contributing to the musical life and culture of New York City for fifty years
 Althea Gibson, after her first Wimbledon win (1957)
 1974 presentation to four Brooklyn teenagers, for heroism in 1973, when they pulled an unconscious man out of the path of an oncoming BMT train.
Joseph G. Greer
Richard Groller
Daniel Gross
John P. Walsh
 Lionel Hampton, in 1978, jazz vibraphonist and bandleader
 James R Brigham Jr., on July 1, 1981, for heroic and dedicated service to the City of New York as Budget Director. Awarded by Edward I. Koch, Mayor.
 Gil Hodges, baseball player (1969)
 Philip Johnson, architect
 William Kavanagh, supporting and enhancing the New York education system
 Martin H. Kennelly, in 1950, mayor of Chicago, Illinois
 Alan King, comedian (1969)
 Martin Luther King Jr., civil rights activist
 Hoyt W Lark, in 1950, Mayor of Cranston Rhode Island
 General Douglas MacArthur, United States Army General
 Carlo MacDonald, lifetime achievement
 Willie Mays, baseball player
 Joseph Mruk, Buffalo, NY. Presented by Mayor William O'Dwyer 1950.
 Joe Namath, football quarterback (1969)
 Lewis Rudin, for lifetime contributions as a property developer
 2019 presentation to 18 people and organizations, for "tireless advocacy, inspiration, and leadership (helping to) pass the permanent authorization of the September 11th Victim Compensation Fund Act"
Luis Alvarez (posthumous): Former New York City Police Detective and 9/11 first-responder
Chief Paul Brown: New York City Department of Sanitation Head of Personnel Management and 9/11 first-responder
Ben Chevat: Executive Director of 9/11 Health Watch
John Feal: Founder of the FealGood Foundation and advocate for 9/11 first-responders
Kimberly Flynn: Director of 9/11 Environmental Action and 9/11 children’s advocate
Lila Nordstrom: 9/11 children’s advocate and founder of StuyHealth
Richard Palmer: Former New York City Department of Correction Warden and 9/11 first-responder
Ray Pfiefer (posthumous): Former New York City Firefighter and 9/11 first-responder
Deborah Reeve (posthumous): Former New York City Fire Department Emergency Medical Technician and 9/11 first-responder
Jon Stewart: Advocate for 9/11 first-responders
James Zadroga (posthumous): Former New York City Police Officer and 9/11 first-responder
Port Authority of New York and New Jersey: accepting by two representatives on behalf of the Port Authority Police Department and the Port Authority civilian employees
Municipal Labor Committee: Association of Labor Unions representing public sector employees in New York City.
U.S. Representative Carolyn B. Maloney: U.S. Representative for New York’s 12th Congressional District
U.S. Representative Peter King: U.S. Representative for New York’s 2nd Congressional District 
U.S. Representative Jerrold Nadler: U.S. Representative for New York’s 10th Congressional District 
U.S. Senator for New York Chuck Schumer
U.S. Senator for New York Kirsten Gillibrand
 Robert Tisch, co-owner of the New York Giants, for renovating 43 New York City school fields (posthumous)
 Felix Vasquez, for heroism for saving the life of a one-month-old baby during a fire in the Bronx - 16 December 2006
 Gordon B. Washburn, renowned museum director, received medal on April 24, 1974 from Mayor Abraham D. Beame. Given upon Mr. Washburn's retirement from the Asia House Gallery. Inscribed "ars longa vita brevis" ["skilfulness takes time and life is short"].
 Fred Wilpon, for a lifetime of service to the City

References

American awards
Culture of New York City
Government of New York City
Municipal awards